The 2022–23 season is the ninth season in Kerala Blasters FC's existence, as well as their ninth season in Indian Super League. This season of the ISL witnesses the return of the home-away format of the matches similar to that of the 2019–20 Indian Super League season after a break of two years due to the COVID-19 pandemic in the country.

Season overview

April 
On 4 April 2022, the Blasters announced the three-year contract extension of head coach Ivan Vukomanović until 2025.

On 6 April, it was confirmed that the 10 home matches of the Blasters will be held in the Jawaharlal Nehru Stadium in Kochi.

On 7 April, the Blasters confirmed the participation of their youth squad in the first ever Reliance Foundation Development League.

On 10 April, the Blasters announced their squad for the inaugural season of the Reliance Foundation Development League.

On 21 April, the Blasters announced the three-year contract extension of defender Bijoy Varghese until 2025. The club also brought back their jersey number 21, which was retired in 2020 after Sandesh Jhingan, who previously donned the shirt left the club.

On 25 April, the Blasters announced the three-year contract extension of midfielder Jeakson Singh until 2025.

May 
On 5 May, the Blasters announced the two-year contract extension of defender Marko Lešković until 2024.

On 11 May, the Blasters announced the two-year contract extension of goalkeeper Prabhsukhan Gill until 2024.

On 30 May, the Blasters announced the one-year contract extension of goalkeeper Karanjit Singh until 2023.

On 31 May, the Blasters announced the departure of the Spanish striker Álvaro Vázquez.

June 
On 1 June, the Blasters announced the departure of the winger Vincy Barretto to Chennaiyin FC after reaching an agreement with the latter.

On 2 June, the Blasters announced the three-year contract extension of goalkeeping coach Slaven Progovecki, and the strength and conditioning coach Werner Martens until 2025.

On 2 June, the Blasters announced the appointment of Rajah Rizwan as the club's academy and women's team director.

On 2 June, the Blasters announced the departure of the Bhutanese forward Chencho Gyeltshen.

On 3 June, the Blasters announced the departures of the goalkeeper Albino Gomes and the winger Seityasen Singh.

On 4 June, the Blasters announced the three-year contract extension of defender Sandeep Singh until 2025.

On 15 June, the Blasters announced signing of Bryce Miranda from Churchill Brothers FC Goa for an undisclosed transfer fee on a four-year deal.

On 23 June, the Blasters announced that they have reached an agreement with Churchill Brothers for the transfer of Saurav Mandal with the transfer remaining subject to the medical.

On 24 June, the Blasters announced the departure of Bosnian defender Enes Sipović.

On 28 June, the Blasters announced the signing of Saurav Mandal from Churchill Brothers for an undisclosed transfer fee on a three-year deal.

July 
On 4 July, the Blasters announced that they have reached an agreement with Mumbai City FC for the transfer of defender Sanjeev Stalin to Mumbai City.

On 6 July, the Blasters announced the departure of defender Denechandra Meitei to Odisha FC on a season long loan deal.

On 8 July, the Blasters announced the signing of Apostolos Giannou as their first foreign singing of the season with the transfer remaining subject to medical.

On 11 July, the Blasters announced the departure of the Argentine forward Jorge Pereyra Díaz.

On 13 July, the Blasters announced the signing of Víctor Mongil as their second foreign signing of the season in a one-year contract with an option to extend.

On 18 July, the Blasters announced the signing of Ivan Kalyuzhnyi as their third foreign signing of the season on a season long loan deal with the transfer remaining subject to medical.

On 18 July, the Blasters were drawn in the Group D of the 2022 Durand Cup tournament.

On 21 July, the Durand Cup announced the fixtures of the Blasters and the participating clubs.

On 21 July, the Blasters announced that they will be travelling to United Arab Emirates on 17 August until 29 August as a part of their pre-season preparations.

On 21 July, the Blasters announced the fixtures of their pre-season friendlies in UAE.

On 22 July, the Blasters announced the two-year contract extension of midfielder Adrián Luna until 2024.

On 23 July, the Blasters announced their squad for the 2022 Next Gen Cup in United Kingdom.

On 25 July, the Blasters announced the formation of their women's team and the appointment of Shereef Khan as the team's head coach for the upcoming season of the Kerala Women's League.

On 25 July, the fixtures of the 2022 Next Gen Cup was announced after the Blasters were drawn in the Group B (London Group) along with the Premier League sides Crystal Palace FC, Tottenham Hotspur FC and West Ham United FC.

August 
On 3 August, the Blasters announced it has reached an agreement for the transfer of Naorem Mahesh Singh to East Bengal Club.

On 4 August, the Blasters announced the signing of Frank Dauwen as their assistant manager for the upcoming season.

On 16 August, the Blasters announced their squad for the 2022 Durand Cup tournament.

On 17 August, the Blasters announced the squad for their pre-season friendlies in UAE.

On 17 August, the Blasters announced the signing of the forward Bidyashagar Singh on a season long loan deal from Bengaluru FC.

On 17 August, the Blasters released the club statement on the cancellation of all of their pre-season friendlies in UAE due to the ban imposed by FIFA on AIFF.

On 18 August, the Blasters announced Yakult as one of their associate partners for the upcoming season.

On 18 August, the Blasters announced 1XBat Sporting Lines as their presenting sponsors for the upcoming season.

On 19 August, the Blasters played their first group-stage match in the Durand Cup against Sudeva Delhi FC which ended in a 1–1 draw. Ajsal opened the scoresheet for the Blasters in the 42nd minute, but Sudeva pulled one back through Kuki right at the stroke of half-time.

On 23 August, the Blasters played their second group-stage match in the Durand Cup against Odisha FC which they lost 2–0. Isaac Vanmalsawma scored the opening goal for Odisha followed by a goal scored by Saúl Crespo which resulted in the Blasters losing their second match in the group-stage.

On 25 August, the Blasters announced the signing of the Greek forward Dimitrios Diamantakos as their final foreign signing of the season.

On 27 August, the Blasters played their third group-stage match in the Durand Cup against NorthEast United FC, which they won 0–3, thus registering their first win in the 2022 Durand Cup. The Blasters found early lead through Mohammed Aimen, which was followed by the goal scored by Ajsal in the 55th minute. Aimen completed his brace in the 90th minute after his twin brother Mohammed Azhar assisted him which helped Azhar to complete his second assist of the game after he assisted to the goal scored by Ajsal.

On 28 August, after the FIFA ban on AIFF was revoked, the Blasters announced that they would play a friendly match against the UAE First Division League side Al Jazira Al Hamra Club on the same day.

On 28 August, the Blasters played their first pre-season friendly match of the season against the Emirati club Al Jazira Al Hamra, which they won 1–5 after Rahul, Mandal, Sahal, Diamantakos and the captain Jessel scored for the Blasters in contrast to the only goal scored by Al Jazira Al Hamra through a free-kick.

On 29 August, the Blasters announced the departures of Sreekuttan VS, Abdul Hakku and Anil Gaonkar from the club.

On 31 August, the Blasters played their final group-stage match in the Durand Cup against Army Green, which they won 2–0. Muhammed Aimen scored the first goal for the Blasters and Aritra Das scored the final goal for the latter, which helped the Blasters to qualify for the knockout stages of the Durand Cup for the first time in their history.

September 
On 1 September, FSDL and the Indian Super League announced the fixtures for the 2022–23 ISL season, and it was decided that the Blasters would face East Bengal in Kochi on 7 October in the season opener.

On 9 September, the Blasters played their quarter-final match in the Durand Cup against Mohammedan SC, which they lost 3–0. Mohammedan netted their first goal through S. K. Faiaz, which was followed by a brace scored by the Nigerian Abiola Dauda in the second-half, which resulted in the elimination of the Blasters from the 131st edition of Durand Cup.

On 17 September, the Blasters played a friendly match against MA College Kothamangalam which they won 3–0 after Lešković, Dimitrios, and Mandal scored a goal each to secure the victory for the Blasters.

On 18 September, the Blasters launched their third-kit for the upcoming season, which was designed to pay tribute to those people residing in the coast lines of Kerala.

On 19 September, the Blasters announced that they have reached an agreement to mutually part ways with Prasanth Mohan, who left the club after spending 6 years for the Blasters.

On 21 September, the Blasters launched their away-kit for the upcoming season.

On 22 September, the Blasters announced Denwud as their associate partner for the upcoming season.

On 25 September, the Blasters announced ClubW as their travel partner for the upcoming season.

On 26 September, the Blasters launched their home-kit for the upcoming season.

On 26 September, the Blasters announced BodyFirst as their official nutrition partner for the upcoming season.

On 29 September, the Blasters announced Kalliyath TMT as one of their official partners for the upcoming season.

On 30 September, the Blasters announced their extension of association with the Suguna Foods' brand, DelFrez as their associate partner for the upcoming season.

October 
On 3 October, the Blasters announced their extension of association with Ather Energy as one of their official partners for the upcoming season.

On 4 October, the Blasters announced the subsidiary of the Tata Group, Cromā as their official electronics partner for the upcoming season.

On 5 October, the Blasters announced ChicKing as their food partner for the upcoming season.

On 5 October, the Blasters announced their squad for the 2022–22 Indian Super League season.

On 6 October, the Blasters announced Bingo! as their snacking partner for the upcoming season.

On 7 October, the Blasters played the opening match of 2022–22 Indian Super League season against East Bengal Club, which they won 3–1. The match took place in JLN Kochi, and the first half ended with neither side scoring a goal. The opening goal of the match was scored by Adrián Luna, who netted a volley after receiving a long ball from Harmanjot Khabra in the 72nd minute. The Blasters found their next goal through Ivan Kalyuzhnyi, who came in as substitute for Apostolos Giannou and scored a solo goal, taking the score to 2–0. East Bengal pulled one back through a goal scored by Alex Lima, but Kalyuzhnyi completed his brace by a long-range volley just one minute after East Bengal found the net and took the scoreline to end with 3–1.

On 10 October, the Blasters announced Amaron as one of their official partners for the occurring season.

On 11 October, the Blasters announced that the BYUJ'S will continue as their principal partner for the next two seasons.

On 13 October, the Blasters announced KIWI Ice Cream as one of their official partner for the occurring season.

On 14 October, the Blasters announced Welcare Hospital as their official medical partner for the occurring season.

On 16 October, the Blasters played their second match of the season against ATK Mohun Bagan FC, which they lost 2–5. Kalyuzhnyi's goal gave the Blasters an early lead in 6th minute of the match, but was equalized by ATK Mohun Bagan through a goal scored by Dimitri Petratos in the 26th minute, who would soon go on the complete his hat-trick with two more goals coming in the second half. Joni Kauko and Lenny Rodrigues scored the other two goals for ATKMB in the first half and second-half respectively, while the Blasters found their second goal through a goal scored by Rahul KP in the 81st minute, who came in as a substitute for Sahal Abdul Samad later in the game, which ended in a disastrous defeat for the Blasters in Kochi.

On 23 October, the Blasters played their third match of the season against Odisha FC, which they lost 2–1. The Blasters opened the score-sheet through Harmanjot Khabra, who netted the ball set-up by Luna by a header in the first-half. The game was snatched by Odisha in the second-half when they pulled two goals back through the goals scored by Jerry Mawihmingthanga, and a late goal scored by the substitute Pedro Martín, which saw the Blasters losing their second-consecutive match of the season.

On 28 October, the Blasters played their fourth match of the season against Mumbai City FC, which they lost 0–2. Mumbai found their first goal in the 21st minute by Mehtab Singh, which was followed by the goal scored by the ex-Blasters player Jorge Pereyra Díaz, who netted the ball in the 31st minute of the match, as the Blasters lost their third-consecutive match of the season.

November 
On 5 November, the Blasters played their fifth match of the season against NorthEast United FC, which they won 0–3. The first-half on the match held in Indira Gandhi Athletic Stadium went goalless, but the Blasters found their first goal of the match when Dimitrios Diamantakos shook the net after receiving a ball from Saurav Mandal from the wing in the 56th minute. Sahal Abdul Samad came in as a substitute for Mandal in the 65th minute of the match, who scored a brace in the last moments of the match as the Blasters won their second match of the season.

On 12 November, the Blasters announced Bank of Baroda as their official banking partner for the occurring season.

On 13 November, the Blasters played their sixth match of the season against FC Goa, which they won 3–1. The majority of the first-half passed with neither side scoring a goal, until Luna's goal in the 42th minute gave the Blasters a 1–0 lead. Blasters extended their lead in the added time of the first-half, as Diamantakos scored a penalty right before the half-time. The Blasters found their third goal of the match through Kalyuzhnyi, who netted a long-ranger in the 52th minute of the match. Goa pulled one back through Noah Sadaoui in the 67th minute, but the Blasters managed to win their third match of the season.

On 19th November, the Blasters played their seventh match of the season against Hyderabad FC, which they won 0–1. The sole goal of the match in the G. M. C. Balayogi Athletic Stadium was scored by Diamantakos in the 18th minute of the game, who scored in his third-consecutive match, as the Blasters defeated the reigning championship winners putting an end to their unbeaten-streak and winning their fourth match of the season. It was also the first time ever that the club made three consecutive win in its history.

December 
On 4 December 2022, the Blasters played their eighth match of the season against Jamshedpur FC which they won 0–1. Diamantakos scored in his fourth-consecutive match in the 17th minute after tapping in a Luna's freekick which served as the only goal as the Blasters won their fourth-consecutive match by defeating the reigning league champions away from home.

On 11 December, the Blasters played their ninth match of the season against the southern rivals Bengaluru FC, which they won 3–2. Bengaluru scored the opening goal through a penalty scored by Sunil Chettri in the 14th minute, but the Blasters equalized through Marko Lešković, who scored his debut goal in the 25th minute of the match. Diamantakos, who scored in his fifth-consecutive match gave the Blasters lead for the first time in the game when he slotted in a ball assisted by Luna in the 43rd minute right before the half-time. Apostolos Giannou scored the third goal of the night for the Blasters, who came in as a substitute for Kalyuzhnyi and scored his debut goal in the 70th minute. Javi Hernández scored the second goal for Bengaluru in the 81st minute but the Blasters managed to win the match by full-time thereby winning their fifth-consecutive match of the season.

On 19 December, the Blasters played their tenth match of the season against the older southern rivals Chennaiyin FC, which ended in a 1–1 draw. The Blasters scored the first goal of the night through Sahal, who scored for the Blasters in the 23rd minute but Chennaiyin levelled the match three minutes into the second-half through the former Blasters man Vincy Barretto, who netted the ball as the match ended in a 1–1 draw.

On 26 December, the Blasters played their eleventh match of the season in the Boxing Day match against Odisha FC, which they won 1–0.  The first-half ended with neither sides finding the net, but the Blasters took their lead in the 86th minute through Sandeep Singh, who scored a header from a Bryce Miranda assist as the sole goal from Sandeep helped the Blasters to win their seventh match of the season and to move to the third spot in the table.

On 29 December, the Blasters announced that they have reached an agreement for the transfer of Puitea to ATK Mohun Bagan for an undisclosed transfer fee.

January 
On 3 January 2023, the Blasters played their twelfth match of the season against Jamshedpur FC, which they won 3–1. Giannou's backheel flick in the 9th minute put the Blasters in a 1–0 early lead, but Jamshedpur found the level through Daniel Chima Chukwu in the 17th minute. Diamantakos, who scored his sixth goal of the season put the Blasters ahead when he scored from the spot in the 31st minute, which was followed by a second-half goal netted by Luna in the 65th minute. This was also the 200th goal for the club in the Indian Super League and became the fourth team to do so, as the Blasters won their eighth match of the season.

On 9 January, the Blasters played their thirteenth match of the season against Mumbai City FC, which they lost 4–0. The Blasters conceded all four goal in the first-half as the ex-Blasters player Jorge Pereyra Díaz scored a brace, along with a goal each by both Greg Stewart and Bipin Singh. This defeat marked the end of the Blasters' eight match unbeaten streak.

On 20 January, it was announced that the twins; Muhammed Aimen and Muhammed Azhar, who represented the club in the 2022 Durand Cup and in the ongoing Kerala Premier League season, were promoted to the first-team.

On 22 January, the Blasters played their fourteenth match of the season against FC Goa, which they lost 3–1. Iker Guarrotxena gave the lead to Goa through a penalty which was doubled by Noah Sadaoui in the first-half. Blasters pulled one back through Diamantakos, who scored his seventh goal of the season in the 51st minute of the match but Redeem Tlang scored the third goal of the night for Goa, as the Blasters lost their fifth game of the season.

On 24 January, the Blasters provided a statement on the injury sustained by Sandeep Singh during the match against FC Goa on 22 January. He sustained a fracture in his ankle during impact after a collision with Goa's Saviour Gama and had to get stitches in his head before being taken out from the match. The club statement further added that Sandeep would undergo a surgery for the same.

On 29 January, the Blasters played their fifteenth match of the season against NorthEast United FC, which they won 2–0. The match was goalless until the 42nd minute where Diamantakos scored a header from an assist from Bryce Miranda, and he completed his brace just two minutes after in the 44th minute, when Luna assisted for the Greek striker as he scored an open-goal thereby doubling their lead before the half-time. The match witnessed no goal in the second-half but the first-half brace from Diamantakos helped the Blasters to win their ninth match of the season.

On 30 January, the Blasters announced that Givson Singh has been loaned-out to Chennaiyin FC for the rest of the season.

On 31 January, the Blasters announced that they have signed midfielder Danish Farooq Bhat from rivals Bengaluru FC on a three and half year contract for an undisclosed fee until 2026.

February 
On 3 February, the Blasters played their sixteenth match of the season against East Bengal Club, which they lost 1–0. Cleiton Silva scored the only goal of the match for East Bengal as the Blasters lost their sixth match of the season.

On 6 February, the Blasters announced Indian cricketer Sanju Samson as their new brand ambassador.

On 7 February, the Blasters played their seventeenth match of the season against Chennaiyin FC, which they won 2–1. Abdenasser El Khayati scored an early goal for Chennaiyin but the Blasters levelled the goal when Luna netted the ball in the 38th minute of the game. Rahul broke the deadlock and won the match for the Blasters as he scored the second goal for the Blasters in the 64th minute and the Blasters won their tenth game of the season, edging near the qualification to knockout stages of the season.

On 11 February, the Blasters played their eighteenth match of the season against Bengaluru FC, which they lost 1–0. Roy Krishna put Bengaluru in front in the 32nd minute of the match as the Blasters lost their seventh match of the season.

On 16 February, the Blasters qualified for the ISL playoffs for the second consecutive time following the 1–2 defeat of FC Goa over Chennaiyin FC. This was the Blasters' fourth qualification to the ISL playoffs in their history.

On 18 February, the Blasters played their nineteenth match of the season against ATK Mohun Bagan FC, which they lost 2–1. Diamantakos scored his tenth goal of the season in the 16th minute of the match to put the Blasters in front, but ATK Mohun Bagan levelled through Carl McHugh in the 23rd minute and scored his second goal in the 71st minute. Rahul was sent-off for a second yellow in the 64th minute as the Blasters lost their eighth match of the season.

On 22 February, the Blasters launched 'House of KBFC', a consumer-focused initiative of the football club.

On 23 February, the Blasters announced the contract extension of their sporting director Karolis Skinkys on a five-year contract till 2028.

On 26 February, the Blasters played their twentieth and last match of the league stage against Hyderabad FC, which they lost 0–1. The only goal of the match was scored by Borja Herrera, who put Hyderabad in front inn the first-half, as the Blasters lost their ninth match of the season.

March 
On 3 March, the Blasters played their knockout match in the playoffs against rivals Bengaluru FC, which was subjected to immense controversy. The match went to extra-time after the first ninety minutes ended in a goalless draw. The match was subjected to controversy when the Bengaluru skipper Sunil Chhetri scored a 'free-kick' goal in the 96th minute. Following the goal, the Blasters players walked-off the pitch after coach Ivan Vukomanović called them off from the pitch. The incident occurred when Chhetri scored a free-kick before the Blasters players set themselves in their defensive positions. The goal was given for Bengaluru and the Blasters players walked-off from the pitch in the Sree Kanteerava Stadium. The match was later stopped by the match officials and Bengaluru was awarded the win and qualification the semi-finals. The Blasters later alleged that the referee asked Luna to move away from ball and hence the free kick should have only been allowed following a whistle. The club seeked for a rematch and a ban on the referee Crystal John, who controlled the match.

On 6 March, the AIFF disciplinary committee rejected the Blasters' protest to replay the controversial knockout stage match against Bengaluru FC and to ban the match referee Crystal John. The separate panel of the AIFF DC that met on the day rejected the case of the Blasters citing that the case did not fall in the exception mentioned in the Article 70.5 of the AIFF disciplinary code, and further issued a notice to the Blasters for the violation of the Article 58.1 of the AIFF disciplinary code by walking-out of the match.

On 7 March, the AIFF announced the draw for the 2023 Indian Super Cup that is to be held in Kerala from 3 April, and the Blasters was drawn in the Group A alongside the rivals Bengaluru FC.

Players

First-Team Squad

Durand Cup Squad

Transfers

Transfers In

Loan Returns

Promoted from Kerala Blasters FC Reserves

Contract Extensions

Loan Outs

Transfers Out

Management

Pre-season and friendlies

Shortly after announcing their fixtures in the Durand Cup, on 21 July 2022, the Blasters announced the fixtures of their friendly matches against three UAE clubs after announcing their plans to begin their pre-season preparations in UAE. They cancelled all of their friendlies in UAE on 16 August 2022 after FIFA suspended AIFF due to “third party intervention”. On 27 August, FIFA revoked the ban on AIFF, and the Blasters announced a friendly match against the Emirati club Al Jazira Al Hamra to be played on 28 August, just one day after the ban was lifted by FIFA.

Note: The Blasters' unofficial friendly match results are not included.

Competitions

Overview

Durand Cup 

Kerala Blasters were drawn in the Group D for the 131st edition of the Durand Cup along with two other ISL sides.

Group stage

Matches

Knockout stage

Indian Super League 
This season of the Indian Super League will be played across the country in home and away formats after two seasons of hosting it in Goa due to the COVID-19 pandemic.

League table

League Results by Round

Matches 
Note: Indian Super League announced the fixtures for the 2022–23 season on 1 September 2022 with the fixture between the Blasters and East Bengal on 7 October serving as the opening match of the season.

Knockout stage

Super Cup 

Kerala Blasters were drawn in the Group A of the 3rd edition of the Super Cup on 7 March in the same group alongside the arch-rivals Bengaluru FC, just four days after the controversial knockout stage match between both the sides in the league phase.

Group stage

Matches

Statistics 
All stats are correct as of 4 March 2023

Squad appearances and goals 
Note: Kerala Blasters fielded their reserve side as their first team for the Durand Cup. As a result, the lists below include the stats of players who featured for the club in different sections of the ISL and the Durand Cup.

Indian Super League and Indian Super Cup 

|-
!colspan=16 style="background:#FFFF00; color:#1047AB;"| Goalkeepers

|-
!colspan=16 style="background:#1047AB; color:#FFFF00;"| Defenders

|-
!colspan=16 style="background:#FFFF00; color:#1047AB;"| Midfielders

|-
!colspan=16 style="background:#1047AB; color:#FFFF00;"| Forwards

|-
!colspan=16 style="background:#FFFF00; color:#1047AB;"| Players who left during the season but made an appearance

|}

Durand Cup 

|-
!colspan=16 style="background:#FFFF00; color:#1047AB;"| Goalkeepers

|-
!colspan=16 style="background:#1047AB; color:#FFFF00;"| Defenders

|-
!colspan=16 style="background:#FFFF00; color:#1047AB;"| Midfielders

|-
!colspan=16 style="background:#1047AB; color:#FFFF00;"| Forwards

|}

Squad statistics

Goalscorers

Assist

Clean-sheets

Disciplinary record

Injury record 
{| class="wikitable" style="text-align:center"
|-
! style="background:#1047AB; color:#FFFF00; | 
! style="background:#1047AB; color:#FFFF00; | 
! style="background:#1047AB; color:#FFFF00; | 
! style="background:#1047AB; color:#FFFF00; | Name
! style="background:#1047AB; color:#FFFF00; | 
! style="background:#1047AB; color:#FFFF00; | 
! style="background:#1047AB; color:#FFFF00; | 
! style="background:#1047AB; color:#FFFF00; | 
! style="background:#1047AB; color:#FFFF00; | 
! style="background:#1047AB; color:#FFFF00; |

Seasonal awards

Indian Super League 

 Best Pitch: Kerala Blasters FC (Jawaharlal Nehru Stadium, Kochi)

Kerala Blasters 

 Kerala Blasters Fans' Player of the Season: Adrián Luna.

Club awards

Indian Super League

ISL Fans' Goal of the Week award 
This is awarded weekly to the players chosen by fans voting at the Indian Super League website.

Kerala Blasters

Kerala Blasters Fans' Player of the Month award 
Note: This is awarded monthly to the players of Kerala Blasters as chosen by the fans via voting in their social media platforms.

Kerala Blasters Fans' Goal of the Month award 
Note: This is awarded monthly to the players of Kerala Blasters as chosen by the fans via voting in their social media platforms.

See also 
 Kerala Blasters FC
 List of Kerala Blasters FC seasons
 Indian Super League
 2022–23 Indian Super League season

References 

Kerala Blasters FC seasons
Kerala Blasters FC